Lamalif was a monthly Moroccan political and cultural magazine published in French between 1966 and 1988.

History and profile
Lamalif was launched in 1966 by Zakya Daoud and her husband Mohamed Loghlam. It took its title from two Arabic letters that form the word "la", meaning "no". Launched after the defeat of the Moroccan opposition (Union Socialiste des Forces Populaires) by the monarchy, Lamalif was a form of challenge. "The goal in this tragic situation was not to lose hope, to build an alternative," explained the founders. Zakya Daoud also served as the editor-in-chief of the monthly during its publication until 1988.

Throughout its 22 years existence, Lamalif was characterised by its intellectual rigour and radical leftist political stance. Covering social, cultural and economical issues, all from a political and critical perspective it established itself as "a space for reflection and a force of significant challenge." Its ideological debates amongst journalists, economists, academics, and politicians became intellectual references and proved seminal in the development of many of Morocco's best thinkers and writers. Its focus on arts and culture was equally influential. Is covers frequently featured work by artists and its writings on film contributed to the rise of Moroccan cinema in the 1970s.

Lamalif was however never exclusionary and it soon established a wide and diverse readership. Ironically it was this success that led to the publications ultimate demise. Its popularity and outspoken stance soon attracted the ire of the authorities and it did not take long before Daoud was "regarded as Public Enemy." After years of threats, censorship and seizures, Lamalif was finally forced to shut down in 1988.

References

External links
 Digitized scans of Lamalif issues available through the Moroccan National Library

Zakya Daoud, Les Années Lamalif, Tarik Editions, 2007 
Laila Lalami, "The Lamalif Years", 15 February 2007 
Abdeslam Kadiri, "Portrait. Les mille vies de Zakya Daoud", TelQuel, 2005. 
"An interview with Zakia Daoud", APN, 9 March 2007 
"Rétrospectivee : Il était une fois la presse", TelQuel

1966 establishments in Morocco
1988 disestablishments in Morocco
Defunct literary magazines
Defunct magazines published in Morocco
Defunct political magazines
French-language magazines
Magazines established in 1966
Magazines disestablished in 1988
Monthly magazines